West Germany competed at the 1988 Summer Paralympics in Seoul, South Korea. 188 competitors from West Germany won 193 medals including 76 gold, 65 silver and 52 bronze and finished 2nd in the medal table.

See also 
 West Germany at the Paralympics
 West Germany at the 1988 Summer Olympics

References 

West Germany at the Paralympics
1988 in West German sport
Nations at the 1988 Summer Paralympics